J. Clark Salyer Wetland Management District is located in north-central North Dakota.

References
website

National Wildlife Refuges in North Dakota